Alfred Connor Bowman (December 18, 1904 – August 2, 1982) was an American lawyer and military leader who was a key figure in the Allied Military Government for Occupied Territories after World War II, especially the areas of Venezia Giulia and Trieste. He also helped develop plans for military occupation of North Korea in 1950 while serving as chief of the army's Military Government Division.

Life and career
Bowman was born in Detroit. He received his A.B. and J.D. degrees from the University of Michigan. He practiced law during the 1930s as the house counsel for a corporation, then served as deputy city attorney of Los Angeles.

During World War II he served in the United States Army, working with General Patton in North Africa and moving north into Italy. After the war he administered government in occupied Italy, Trieste specifically. He worked towards accord between Italian Republican, Yugoslav, and Allied Forces. Bowman advocated a preference for using Italian and Italian place names while in Trieste despite the diversity and 'melting pot' nature of the city.

Later, in the 1950's he was in the Office of the Judge Advocate General (OTJAG) for the First Army and investigated the Texas City Disaster.

Bowman died in Los Angeles in 1982.

Bibliography 
Bowman, Alfred Connor. Zones Of Strain: A Memoir Of The Early Cold War. Stanford: Hoover Institution Press, 1982.

See also 
Italy–Yugoslavia relations

References

External links
Overview of the Alfred Connor Bowman papers via Hoover Institution Archives

1904 births
1982 deaths
Military personnel from Detroit
Lawyers from Detroit
Writers from Detroit
Writers from Los Angeles
University of Michigan Law School alumni
California lawyers
20th-century American lawyers